Paradise Point may refer to:

 Paradise Point, Pakistan
 Paradise Point, Queensland, a coastal suburb in the City of Gold Coast, Australia
 Paradise Point State Park, Washington
 Paradise Point State Recreation Site, Oregon

See also
 Fisher's Paradise, historic home; also known as Paradise Point